South Norwalk station is a commuter rail stop on the Metro-North Railroad's New Haven Line and CTrail's Shore Line East located in Norwalk, Connecticut. It is owned and managed by the Norwalk Transit District. The station is the point where the New Haven Line's Danbury Branch connects to the Northeast Corridor, as well as a peak-hour terminal for some express trains. It is the last stop for New Haven super-express trains before they run non-stop to Grand Central Terminal in New York. Just east of the station is the South Norwalk Railroad Bridge, and next to that is the SoNo Switch Tower Museum, a preserved switch tower which is open on summer weekend afternoons. Amtrak uses the inner tracks as it does not stop at South Norwalk.

The predecessor station in the same location was named Norwalk & South Norwalk in timetables of the New York, New Haven and Hartford and successor Penn Central.

History

The newer, main station building, on the westbound (New York City-bound) side of the tracks, was built in 1994. It has a cafe serving coffee, breakfast sandwiches, and pastries during the morning. The New York side's station building consists of a small waiting area with a gigantic glass arch, overlooking the tracks. To reach either side, passengers go through a pedestrian underpass. The New York side consists of a six-level parking garage with taxi and bus stands. The Norwalk Parking Authority owns the garage along with the New Haven side's parking lot.

The station was the first to receive Wi-Fi service on the New Haven Line in March 2006. The service was provided for one year from a federal grant received from the "One Coast, One Future" initiative designed to help economic development in Stamford, Norwalk and Bridgeport. The grant provides for Wi-Fi service for one year with the expectation that local governments will provide it in the future if they find it valuable enough to do so. Similar service was planned for Stamford and Bridgeport stations in the spring of 2006 but no others. Westport also started providing the service in the spring of 2006.

The City of Norwalk and the Norwalk Transit District let a contract for $238,000 in February 2008 to study possible improvements to the South Norwalk Station with a goal to make it a better "intermodal" facility with improved access for cars, buses, shuttles, pedestrians, and taxis. In late 2008, a renovation project began at the station, involving the installation of power-assist doors, better smoke detectors, emergency lights and energy-efficient lights. Other work included cleaning brickwork, painting, improving signs and moving the automated pay station. improved landscaping and traffic flow. A Norwalk city government official said the changes were meant to make the station more inviting and give visitors a better impression of Norwalk.

In 2010, the rail bridges over Monroe Street adjacent to the station were replaced. As part of the replacement the stairways that used to provide pedestrian access to either platform from Monroe Street were removed along with concealment of the original red sandstone abutments behind steel reinforced concrete facings. In 2012, permanent art was installed in the New Haven lobby and through the connecting tunnel as part of the Norwalk Parking Authority's 'Art in Parking Places' program through a collaboration with the Norwalk Arts Commission and the Norwalk Transit funded by the Federal Transit Administration Public Art Grant.

Station layout
The station has two high-level island platforms. Each is 10 cars long on the Northeast Corridor main tracks, but only 2 cars long for the outer tracks. The northern platform, adjacent to Tracks 3 and 5, is generally used by westbound New Haven Line trains on Track 3 and Danbury Branch trains on Track 5. The southern platform, adjacent to Tracks 4 and 6, is generally used by eastbound New Haven Line trains on Track 4 and Danbury Branch trains on Track 6. The New Haven Line has six tracks at this location. The two inner tracks, not adjacent to either platform, are used only by express trains. Tracks 5 and 6 terminate at the station and only continue northward.

The station has approximately 800 parking spaces, none owned by the state.

The older station building at the eastbound side of the tracks contains a small restaurant. This side features a bus station and taxi stands. The  space is subleased from the New England Fashion Design Association.

References

External links

Norwalk Parking Authority
 An updated Transit Oriented Development Study commissioned by the Norwalk Redevelopment Agency is available at 

Metro-North Railroad stations in Connecticut
Stations on the Northeast Corridor
Stations along New York, New Haven and Hartford Railroad lines
Buildings and structures in Norwalk, Connecticut
Railroad stations in Fairfield County, Connecticut